Arthur Robert Emmett,  (born 1943) is an Australian judge who served as a member of the New South Wales Court of Appeal from 7 March 2013 to 30 September 2015, and has continued to serve as an Acting Judge of the Court of Appeal since that date. From 1997 until 2013 he was a judge of the Federal Court of Australia. Prior to 1997 he had a career in private legal practice as a barrister and solicitor.

Biography
Emmett was educated at North Sydney Boys High School and the University of Sydney, where he earned a Bachelor of Arts in 1964, a Bachelor of Laws in 1967, and a Master of Laws in 1976. Emmett has lectured in Roman Law at the Sydney Law School, where he holds the title of Challis Lecturer in Roman Law since 1990. On 22 May 2009, the University of Sydney conferred upon Emmett the degree of Doctor of Laws (honoris causa).

Personal life
His wife Sylvia (née Street), previously served as a judge of the Federal Circuit Court of Australia and is the daughter of the late Chief Justice of the Supreme Court of New South Wales, Sir Laurence Street. They have six children: Laurence, Hilary, Robert, James, Phoebe-Jane, and Christopher.

References

1943 births
Living people
Judges of the Federal Court of Australia
Judges of the Supreme Court of New South Wales
Sydney Law School alumni
People educated at North Sydney Boys High School
Academic staff of the University of Sydney